King Hussein Medical City (Arabic مدينة الحسين الطبية), is a Military Medical Complex is have five hospitals situated in Amman, Jordan. It is affiliated to the major Jordanian Royal Medical Services hospitals; also known as JRMS. JRMS has a wide network of hospitals distributed in different provinces across the kingdom of Jordan. And The king Hussein medical center is a major part of JRMS.

Facilities in the medical compound
The King Hussein Medical Center has five hospitals with a capacity of more than 900 beds and it also includes reference center for laboratory studies on the regional level, the hospitals are as follow:
 Al-Hussein Hospital: has established in 1973, There is first general hospital at King Hussein Medical City, There is one of the busiest general hospital in Jordan with an annual admission rate of 25,000 patients
 Royal Rehabilitation Center: is a rehabilitation hospital was established in 1983, capacity of 150 beds
 Queen Alia Heart Institute: , specialist hospital is established in 1983, has a capacity of 170 beds
 Princess Iman Center for Research and Laboratory Sciences: a reference center for the laboratory investigations, founded in 2001. It received the first place in the accuracy of test results for diagnosis of thalassemia among 155 global laboratory quality control programs for the global laboratory testing in 2009.
 Prince Hussein Center for Urology and Organ Transplant: , the specialist hospital founded in 2000, has a capacity of 73 beds
 Queen Rania Pediatric Hospital: was established and treats all kinds of pediatric disorders including cancer of all kinds.

Accreditations
 ISO 15189
 Jordan Health Care Accreditation Commission (JHAC)

See also
 King Hussein Cancer Center
 King Abdullah University Hospital

References

External links
 King Hussein Medical Center

Hospitals in Amman
1973 establishments in Jordan